El Paso Locomotive FC is an American professional soccer team based in El Paso, Texas. Founded in 2018, the team made its debut in the USL Championship in 2019.

Club crest and colors

The Locomotive brand was unveiled on October 4, 2018, beating out finalists Lagartos, Estrellas, Stars, and Tejanos. The crest is shaped in a manner similar to Mission Style buildings and features three main colors: West Texas Sky blue, Desert Dusk blue, and High Noon Sun. The crest has 11 vertical stripes that represent the eleven players on the field and resemble the front of a locomotive. A city icon, The Star on The Mountain, adorns the top of the crest, which is shaped in the silhouette of the Franklin Mountains.

Sponsorship

Stadium
The club play at Southwest University Park, a baseball stadium in Downtown El Paso that is also the home field for the El Paso Chihuahuas of the Pacific Coast League.

Rivalries 
El Paso's primary rivals are New Mexico United and FC Juárez.

Players and staff

Roster

Front-office staff
 Alan Ledford – president
 Andrew Forrest – general manager

Technical staff
 Brian Clarhaut – head coach & technical director
 Marina Schachowskoj – assistant coach, video analysis 
 Gianluca Masucci – assistant coach
 Juan Carlos JC Garzon – goalkeeper coach 
 Saul Soto – coordinator, equipment and player operations

Team records

Year-by-year

1. Top scorer includes statistics from league matches only.

Head coaches
 Includes USL Regular Season, USL Playoffs, U.S. Open Cup. Excludes friendlies.

Average attendance

Honors

Minor
 Copa Tejas (Division 2)
 Winners (1): 2021
 Copa Tejas (Shield)
 Winners (1): 2021

Player honors

References

External links
 

 
USL Championship teams
2018 establishments in Texas
Association football clubs established in 2018
Sports in El Paso, Texas